Mentor is the largest city in Lake County, Ohio, United States. The population was 47,450 at the 2020 census. It is part of the Cleveland metropolitan area.

Mentor was first settled in 1797. In 1876, James A. Garfield purchased a home in Mentor, from which he conducted the first successful front porch campaign for the presidency; the house is now maintained as the James A. Garfield National Historic Site. The city is home to Headlands Beach State Park, the longest public swimming beach in Ohio. The city is a major center of retail stores, ranking sixth-largest in Ohio , and restaurants, ranking seventh-largest in the state . Mentor Avenue (US 20) is the major retail center, which includes the Great Lakes Mall, with additional shopping and strip malls found along most major roads. Convenient Food Mart is based in Mentor. Major products include medical related, polymers, plastics, electric boards and other peripherals that generally serve the computer and automation industries. Two major railroads pass through the city, CSX Transportation and Norfolk Southern. Medical equipment company Steris is based in Mentor.

Mentor is named after the Greek figure Mentor, in keeping with the Connecticut Western Reserve settlers' tradition, as well as that of most other Americans at the time, of celebrating aspects of Greek classicism (nearby Solon, Macedonia, Euclid, and Akron also were named using that principle). In July 2010, CNNMoney.com ranked Mentor 37th in a list of the Top 100 Best Small Cities to Live in America.

Etymology
The pronunciation of the city's name is a shibboleth, with many residents pronouncing it as "men-ner" and outsiders using the more conventional "men-tore", while in the media and among most residents, "men-ter" is prominent.  The city's slogan, "It's better in Mentor," reflects this fact.

History

Mentor was formally established in 1855 but founded in the late eighteenth century by Charles Parker who built the first settlement.
This settlement was established before Ohio became the 17th state in the Union in 1803. About 5 years later in 1808, Lake County, the smallest county in Ohio, was established by separating it from Geaugau County. 
It earned the nickname, "Rose Capital of the Nation" due to the abundant rosebushes that grew throughout the city. During the time this nickname developed, Mentor's tourist industry boomed due to Clevelanders trying to escape a dirty, industrial atmosphere. Post World War II, most Mentor dwellers had cars and could efficiently drive to work. This caused an increase in middle and working-class families and by 2000, about 50,000 people lived in Mentor.
The "Official Flag of the City of Mentor" was designed by Brad Frost in 1988 for a contest by Mentor Headlands. The flag's appearance is similar to Ohio's flag in that they have similar shapes, a large blue triangle, and stripes. The blue triangle represents Ohio's hills while the stripes represent roads and waterways. There is a white circle, symbolizing Ohio, with a cardinal, the official bird of Ohio and Mentor, sitting in the middle. There are six stars surrounding the circle symbolizing the 6 original townships, including Mentor, surveyed in 1797.

Geography

Mentor is a suburb of Cleveland and is located on the south shore of Lake Erie. The Mentor Headlands area of Mentor, located in the northeast portion of the city, was settled in 1797 by Connecticut Land Company surveyors.

Climate
The average temperature in Mentor is  49.90 °F which is comparable to the Ohio average temperature of  50.88 °F but lower than the national average of 54.45 °F. The annual average for precipitation is 42.87 inches which is higher than the national and state average, Mentor averages 93.4 days with more than .1 inches of rain. This is higher than Ohio's average of 80 days. Mentor expects about 61.25 days with 1 or more inches of snow. The wind average is 18.61 mph and humidity is 75.82%.

Demographics

2010 census
As of the census of 2010, there were 47,159 people, 19,166 households, and 13,339 families residing in the city. The racial makeup of the city was 96.3% White, 1.0% African American, 0.1% Native American, 1.4% Asian, 0.3% from other races, and 1.0% from two or more races. Hispanic or Latino of any race were 1.3% of the population.

There were 19,166 households, of which 28.8% had children under the age of 18 living with them, 56.4% were married couples living together, 9.4% had a female householder with no husband present, 3.8% had a male householder with no wife present, and 30.4% were non-families. 25.7% of all households were made up of individuals, and 11.1% had someone living alone who was 65 years of age or older. The average household size was 2.44 and the average family size was 2.94.

The median age in the city was 44.8 years. 21.2% of residents were under the age of 18; 6.9% were between the ages of 18 and 24; 22.3% were from 25 to 44; 33.2% were from 45 to 64; and 16.5% were 65 years of age or older. The gender makeup of the city was 48.4% male and 51.6% female.

2000 census
As of the census of 2000, there were 50,278 people, 18,797 households, and 14,229 families residing in the city. The population density was 1,878.2 people per square mile (725.2/km2). There were 19,301 housing units at an average density of 721.0 per square mile (278.4/km2). The racial makeup of the city was 97.30% Caucasian, 0.64% African American, 0.05% Native American, 1.19% Asian, 0.03% Pacific Islander, 0.18% from other races, and 0.61% from two or more races. Hispanic or Latino of any race were 0.72% of the population. 19.8% were of German, 15.1% Italian, 13.1% Irish, 8.8% English, 6.5% Polish, 5.5% Slovene and 5.4% American ancestry according to Census 2000.

There were 18,797 households, out of which 35.8% had children under the age of 18 living with them, 63.6% were married couples living together, 8.9% had a female householder with no husband present, and 24.3% were non-families. 20.5% of all households were made up of individuals, and 8.1% had someone living alone who was 65 years of age or older. The average household size was 2.65 and the average family size was 3.08.

In the city the population was spread out, with 25.9% under the age of 18, 6.5% from 18 to 24, 29.0% from 25 to 44, 26.3% from 45 to 64, and 12.3% who were 65 years of age or older. The median age was 39 years. For every 100 females, there were 94.2 males. For every 100 females age 18 and over, there were 91.5 males.

The median income for a household in the city was $57,230, and the median income for a family was $65,322. Males had a median income of $44,021 versus $31,025 for females. The per capita income for the city was $24,592. About 1.8% of families and 2.7% of the population were below the poverty line, including 2.8% of those under age 18 and 4.4% of those age 65 or over.

Education

Mentor Public Schools

Mentor Exempted Village School District operates the public schools in the community. Mentor's school system consists of eight elementary schools, two middle schools, and Mentor High School. Like many school systems in Ohio, Mentor Schools suffered a financial crisis in the early 2000s, but passed a large levy and is now largely on solid footing. It is one of the fastest Ohio school systems ever to emerge from fiscal emergency. The financial difficulties were due in part to years of accounting fraud.

Elementary schools:
 Bellflower Elementary
 Fairfax Elementary
 Hopkins Elementary
 Lake Elementary (in Mentor-on-the-Lake)
 Orchard Hollow Elementary
Ridge Elementary (Formerly Ridge Middle School)
 Sterling Morton Elementary

Middle schools:
 Memorial Middle School
 Shore Middle School

High school:
 Mentor High School

Special needs schools:
 CARES (Formerly Headlands Elementary)
Re-Education Services Inc. (Formerly Reynolds Elementary)

Private schools
Lake Catholic High School
Mentor Christian School (K–12)
Mentor Heritage Christian Academy (K–12) (closed in 2010)
St. Mary's of Assumption (K–8)

Parks and recreation

Many bike paths have been built in Mentor in recent years. The parks in the city include:
 Bellflower Skatepark
Located at Bellflower Elementary School. During daylight hours, skateboarders can use the park's ¼ pipe, launch ramp and grind box. 
 Civic Center Park
Site of many festivals, day camps, and annual Fourth of July Fireworks. Includes the Civic Center water park with an Olympic sized pool, waterslide, children's play area, and Civic Arena. There is also a skate park featuring two different areas, one for experienced and for non experienced skaters.
Commemorative Rose Garden
This garden was constructed in 1988 and commemorates Mentor's 25th year as a city 
Donald E Krueger Park
Features a pavilion, four soccer fields, and indoor or outdoor seating.
Edward R. Walsh Park
Formerly known as Bellflower park, it includes a playground, rentable pavilion, fishing pond, skatepark, fitness course, basketball courts, baseball and soccer fields.
Eleanor B Garfield Park
One of the largest parks including  a Community Recreation Center, outdoor pool, All People's Playground, baseball and soccer fields, basketball and tennis courts, fishing pond, and wildlife area
Headlands Beach State Park
The longest beach in the State of Ohio.
Mentor Beach Park
Scenic park overlooking Lake Erie with a playground, lake front pavilion, and soccer field.
Mentor Dog Park
Separated fenced in areas for large or small dogs with a dog water fountain and benches.
Mentor Lagoons Nature Preserve & Marina
Located on the shores of Lake Erie with multiple hiking and biking trails giving views to the Mentor Marsh, marina, shoreline, and rare dune plants.
Morton Community Park
Easily access to walking trails, wildlife, and scenery since it is next to the Mentor Marsh Nature Preserve. Additionally, it houses Morton Pool and Spray park, a pavilion, skatepark, and basketball courts.
Presidents Park
Neighborhood park with a pavilion, playground, basketball and tennis courts.
Tiefenbach Park
Provides ramps to skaters and bikers.
Veteran's Memorial
Designed and built by city employees and dedicated as a tribute to veterans in 2006. Features 5 flags representing the 5 divisions of the armed forces and 5 benches facing a brick wall to represent the circle of life. The opportunity to purchase a brick in memoriam of a fallen veteran and placed in the Memorial Walkway is available.
Veteran's Park
Mentor's first neighborhood park offers fishing piers, hiking trails, and wildlife viewing area

Crime
In 2014, Amazon published a documentary about severe bullying and harassment in Mentor High School which led to at least four suicides starting in 2010. The filmmaker received ten violent threats after the release of the film's trailer. CBS News also published a story about the bully-related suicides that Mentor High School has become known for. The Boston Globe wrote about the documentary, saying "This is a problem of not just one town, but of the entire culture of conformity. It’s much bigger than just one bad kid or bad teacher. In my films I'm interested in looking at the whole problem rather than the easy answers." The Daily Beast called Mentor High School "Suicide High."

In 2016, Mentor's rate of 1.1 violent crimes per 1,000 residents was equal to the average (median) among Ohio cities. However, its rate of 22.1 property crimes per 1,000 residents was higher than the state median of 18.3 per 1,000 people. The property crime rate was high primarily due to the incidence of theft (larceny) in the city.

Mentor's crime rating is 152 which is in the "high" range and 139.8 points lower than the national average (high frequency of crime=high rating)

Notable people

 Marc Andreyko, comic book writer
 Barbara Armonas, Lithuanian political prisoner
 Ken Babbs, author
 Jim Bonfanti, musician
 William W. Corning, politician
 James A. Garfield, twentieth president of the United States of America
 Bob Hallen, NFL football player
 Bob Harris, writer
 Joe Jurevicius, NFL football player
 Ben Kelly, NFL football player
 Dustin Kirby, MLS soccer player
 Dave Lucas, poet
 Dan Ryczek, NFL football player
 Paul Ryczek, NFL football player
 Michael Salinger, poet
 Riley Ann Sawyers ("Baby Grace"), murder victim
 Katie Spotz, endurance rower
 Ricky Stanzi, NFL football player
 Jim Tressel, former Ohio State University football coach
 Mitchell Trubisky, NFL football player
 David Wilcox, singer/songwriter

References

Further reading

External links
 
 

 
Cities in Ohio
Cities in Lake County, Ohio
Ohio populated places on Lake Erie
Populated places established in 1797
Cleveland metropolitan area